Eremophila papillata is a flowering plant in the figwort family, Scrophulariaceae and is endemic to Western Australia. It is an erect, compact shrub with sticky, narrow leaves and mauve, blue or purple, rarely white flowers.

Description
Its leaves and branches are sticky due to the presence of large amounts of resin. They have a covering of branches hairs when young and have many small, raised, pimply glands.

The petal tube is dark purple to lilac-coloured or blue, rarely white on the outside and white with faint lilac-purple spots inside. The outer surface of the petal tube and lobes and the inner surface of the lobes are glabrous but the inside of the tube is filled with long, soft hairs. The 4 stamens are fully enclosed in the petal tube.

Taxonomy and naming 
The species was first formally described by Robert Chinnock in 2007 and the description was published in Eremophila and Allied Genera: A Monograph of the Plant Family Myoporaceae. The specific epithet (papillata) is a Latin word meaning "budlike", referring to the small, nipple-like glands on the leaves of this species.

Distribution and habitat
Eremophila papillata occurs between Kondinin and Wongan Hills in the Avon Wheatbelt and Mallee biogeographic regions where it grows in hard clay-loam.

Conservation
This species is classified as "not threatened" by the Western Australian Government Department of Parks and Wildlife.

Use in horticulture
This compact, small to medium-sized shrub has dark green leaves which contrast with its blue or purple flowers. It is a hardy garden plant which can be propagated from cuttings taken at most times of the year and grown in most soils, including clay. It prefers full sun but only needs one or two waterings through even the longest droughts and is generally tolerant of frosts.

References

Eudicots of Western Australia
papillata
Endemic flora of Western Australia
Plants described in 2007
Taxa named by Robert Chinnock